Historic Broadway station is an under construction underground light rail station on the A Line and the E Line of the Los Angeles Metro Rail system. It is located at the southeast corner of 2nd Street and Broadway in the Historic Core section of Downtown Los Angeles. In planning documents, the station was originally going to be named 2nd St/Broadway.

Construction on the station is complete and the line is currently undergoing testing before an expected opening in early 2023.

Historic Broadway is part of the Regional Connector project, a tunnel through Downtown Los Angeles that will connect the current Metro Rail A, E, and L Lines. The station is planned to be served by both the restructured A Line, connecting Long Beach and Azusa, and the restructured E Line, connecting Santa Monica and East Los Angeles. The station is sited in a private right of way, requiring agreements with the property's owner before a high-rise could be built on the site in the future. It was constructed via the sequential excavation method, the first time Metro has utilized the process. The Regional Connector is scheduled to open in 2023.

Service

Station layout

Hours and frequency

Notable places nearby 
The station is within walking distance of the following notable places:
 Broadway Theater District
 Caltrans District 7 Headquarters
 LAPD Headquarters
 Times Mirror Square

References

External links
2nd St/Broadway Station – Regional Connector Project

Future Los Angeles Metro Rail stations
Railway stations scheduled to open in 2023
Broadway (Los Angeles)